Chad Austin Tracy (born May 22, 1980) is an American former professional baseball third baseman. He played in Major League Baseball (MLB) from 2004 to 2010 and again from 2012 to 2013 for the Arizona Diamondbacks, Chicago Cubs, Florida Marlins, and Washington Nationals. He also played for the Hiroshima Toyo Carp of Nippon Professional Baseball (NPB).

College career and draft
Tracy compiled a .339 batting average during his career at East Carolina University. In 2000, he played collegiate summer baseball with the Orleans Cardinals of the Cape Cod Baseball League and was named a league all-star. He was selected by the Arizona Diamondbacks in the seventh round of the 2001 Major League Baseball draft.

Professional career

Minor league career
He played third base in El Paso, Texas, for the El Paso Diablos. In four minor league seasons, Tracy hit .335 with 24 home runs, 85 doubles, and 206 RBIs in 337 games.  In , he was selected to participate in the Futures Game during the All-Star break as the starting third baseman on the U.S. squad.

Arizona Diamondbacks

2004–08
He finished his rookie season with a .285 average, eight home runs, 53 RBIs, and a .343 on-base percentage in 143 games. He led NL third basemen with 25 errors, and he had a major-league-low .935 fielding percentage at third.

In , Tracy had a breakout season, as he batted .308 (7th-best in the league) with 27 home runs and 72 RBIs. He also had a slugging percentage of .533, 10th-best in the NL.

Tracy's numbers dipped in the  season.  He batted .281 with 20 homers and 80 RBIs. His slugging percentage went down over 100 points from his 2005 total, going from .553 to .451.  His 129 strikeouts went up as they nearly doubled his 2005 total.  He also tied Edwin Encarnación for the major league lead in errors by a third baseman, with 25, as he again had a .935 fielding percentage at third base.

His numbers dipped again in 2007, as he batted .264—the lowest batting average of his major league career.  He batted .222 with 2 out and runners in scoring position.

In 2008, he had his lowest on-base percentage (.308) and slugging percentage (.414) of his major league career, as he batted .267.  He again batted .222 with 2 out and runners in scoring position.

2009

On May 6, 2009, Tracy (who was batting .224) was taken out of the starting lineup, replaced by Josh Whitesell, who was called up to the Diamondbacks after hitting .356 for the Reno Aces with a .477 on-base percentage (2nd in the Pacific Coast League) and a .552 slugging percentage.  Manager Bob Melvin said Whitesell would get a chance to play every day, and that Tracy "is going to pinch hit, (and) he's going to fill in at third and first for a while."  That did not last long, however, as on May 19, not even two weeks later, Melvin had been fired as manager and the team optioned Whitesell back to Reno.

A right-oblique strain that Tracy suffered May 29 led to him being placed on the 15-day disabled list.  Tracy came off the disabled list after missing 27 games.

Tony Clark was released in mid-July, and Whitesell was called back up for the third time in the season to replace him on July 16.  Tracy said: Obviously, I want the playing time, I want to be out there every day.  Right now, there are a lot of question marks, especially for me, and some of the other guys that are on their last year of their contract or have some value to be traded, so I think we're probably at that point now where anything can happen. I wouldn't be surprised by anything.  Manager A.J. Hinch spoke with Tracy, who was batting a career-low .222 with a .288 on-base percentage at the time, and Whitesell on July 17.  He told them that Whitesell would get the bulk of the action at first base, starting four or five times a week "for the time being".  After the 2009 season, the Arizona Diamondbacks did not pick up Tracy's 2010 option, which permitted Tracy to file for free agency.

Chicago Cubs, New York Yankees, and Florida Marlins

2010
On January 26, 2010, Tracy signed a minor league contract with the Chicago Cubs with an invite to spring training. The deal was announced on January 27, 2010.  On March 29, the Cubs announced that Tracy had made the major league Cubs' 25 man roster.  On May 7,  Tracy was sent down to the Triple-A Iowa Cubs to make room for Starlin Castro. Tracy was designated for assignment by the Cubs.  Tracy was released by the Cubs on July 1, 2010.

Tracy signed with the New York Yankees on July 9, 2010, and he was assigned to the Scranton/Wilkes-Barre Yankees but eventually opted out of his contract, making him a free agent.

Tracy signed with the Florida Marlins on August 5, 2010.

Hiroshima Toyo Carp

2011
Tracy signed with the Hiroshima Toyo Carp of Japan to play the 2011 season.

Washington Nationals

2012–2013
Chad Tracy signed a minor league deal with the Washington Nationals in the spring of 2012. He showed enough improvement at the plate during spring training to make the club's opening day roster. He was made a member of the Nationals' bench, where he was a productive left-handed bat. In two seasons, he hit .269 in 2012 but declined to just .202 in 2013, his final season for the Nationals.

Los Angeles Angels of Anaheim and retirement

2014
Tracy signed a minor league deal with the Los Angeles Angels of Anaheim on January 29, 2014. He was released on March 23. On April 26, Tracy announced his retirement from baseball.

Personal life
In 2007, Tracy married Katie Martin.  They have four daughters: Ella, Brynn, Leah, and Ruthie. He now coaches a softball team called, Team NC Baylog/Tracy.

References

External links

1980 births
Living people
Arizona Diamondbacks players
Chicago Cubs players
Florida Marlins players
Washington Nationals players
Baseball players from Charlotte, North Carolina
East Carolina Pirates baseball players
Major League Baseball third basemen
South Bend Silver Hawks players
Yakima Bears players
El Paso Diablos players
Tucson Sidewinders players
Reno Aces players
Iowa Cubs players
Scranton/Wilkes-Barre Yankees players
Potomac Nationals players
Syracuse Chiefs players
Baseball players at the 2011 Pan American Games
American expatriate baseball players in Japan
Hiroshima Toyo Carp players
Orleans Firebirds players
Pan American Games competitors for the United States